Wells-Schaff House, also known as "Welkin," is a historic home located at Sistersville, Tyler County, West Virginia. It was built in 1832, and is a two-story, Federal-style brick residence.  It features a one-story front porch with Doric order columns added about 1896.  The rear addition was built about 1935.  Also on the property is a summer house (c. 1935) and the Wells Family cemetery containing the grave of Charles Wells (1745-1815), founder of Wells' Landing.

It was listed on the National Register of Historic Places in 1986.

References

Houses on the National Register of Historic Places in West Virginia
Federal architecture in West Virginia
Houses completed in 1832
Houses in Tyler County, West Virginia
National Register of Historic Places in Tyler County, West Virginia